The Sanford Mainers are a collegiate summer baseball team based in Sanford, Maine. The team, a member of the New England Collegiate Baseball League, plays their home games at Goodall Park.

In late 2001, New England Collegiate Baseball League approached the Town of Sanford about the potential of having a team. Sanford's former Parks and Recreation Director Marcel Blouin met with various officials, and proposed Goodall Park as the home field for a team.

Start-up funds were provided through local businessmen Allen Mapes, Ron Woodward, and Geoff Titherington, as well as Neil Olson, a businessman from Bethel, Maine who had previously been involved with the Lowell All-Americans organization, a former member of the NECBL. In the second year, local investors Bob Hardison, Bob Gonyou, Joe Vitko, Gary Miller, and Curtis Jacks also joined the management team. After a few years, the Mainers' management group agreed the team should be operated by the shareholders, and shifted ownership to a volunteer group of citizens of Sanford-Springvale and local communities, becoming a non-profit organization.

Mainers attendance
The following is a list of Sanford Mainers attendance figures at Goodall Park dating back to the team's inception in the 2002 season. The team's record average attendance came in the 2005 season, when an average of 699 spectators attended each home game.

Postseason appearances
Since 2002, the Sanford Mainers have claimed the league championship twice, the organization's first in 2004 and their second in 2008. Since then, the Mainers have appeared in the final round (2014 and 2016), but fell just short to the Newport Gulls and Mystic Schooners, respectively. In the franchise's history, the team has made the postseason all but three times.

Media
The team's games are broadcast on the NECBL Broadcast Network through BlueFrame Technology, as well as locally on 104.3 FM, AM 1220 The Legends WWSF. Until the 2012 season, games were only broadcast on the NECBL Broadcast Network. The radio station announced in March 2012 plans to broadcast away games, as well.

References

External links
 Sanford Mainers Official Site
 NECBL Website

New England Collegiate Baseball League teams
Amateur baseball teams in Maine
2002 establishments in Maine
Sanford, Maine
Baseball teams established in 2002